Oxymesterone (brand names Anamidol, Balnimax, Oranabol, Sanaboral, Theranabol, Tubil), also known as methandrostenediolone, as well as 4-hydroxy-17α-methyltestosterone or 17α-methylandrost-4-en-4,17β-diol-3-one, is an orally active anabolic-androgenic steroid (AAS). It was known by 1960.

References

Androgens and anabolic steroids
Androstanes
Diols
Hepatotoxins
Ketones
World Anti-Doping Agency prohibited substances